Lovely Mount is an extinct unincorporated community in Radford, Virginia.  Before 1854, and the arrival of the Virginia and Tennessee Railroad, Lovely Mount had a population of 30, but grew to more than 100 within 2 years. By 1890 the town had grown to more than 3000 and was eventually absorbed into the town of Radford in 1891.

References

Former municipalities in Virginia
1890s disestablishments in Virginia
Populated places disestablished in the 1890s